Peter Devine (stage name Andy Devine, 28 February 1942 – 27 January 2022) was a British actor primarily on television, whose best known role was Shadrach Dingle on one of ITV's long-running soap operas, Emmerdale. He played Shadrach on and off starting in 2000 and made his final appearance in July 2010. His credits have occasionally been confused with those of the American actor Andy Devine (1905–1977). Devine served in the Royal Navy for eight years after joining at aged 17 in 1959.  He was also a classical actor before going into the soaps.

Life and career
Devine began his acting career in 1963. He mainly had minor roles, such as an uncredited Draconian Guard in several episodes of the Doctor Who story Frontier in Space. He also had a memorably prominent role as a gay man in the iconic Channel 4 series Queer As Folk, and he appeared in an episode of Linda Green, playing the eponymous lead character's abrasive and lecherous boss Syd Jenkins. He also performed his Emmerdale character Shadrach Dingle character on the ITV show Harry Hill's TV Burp. On 23 July 2010, Devine left Emmerdale after over ten years on the soap as his character Shadrach Dingle was killed off in an emotional storyline related to alcohol abuse.

Devine died in Southport Hospital on 27 January 2022, at the age of 79 of a "hospital-acquired pneumonia" following a fall at his home.

Filmography

References

External links

1942 births
2022 deaths
English male soap opera actors
People from Cheetham Hill
Actors from Manchester
Accidental deaths from falls